Opsotheresia obesa is a species of bristle fly in the family Tachinidae.

Distribution
United States.

References

Dexiinae
Diptera of North America
Taxa named by Charles Henry Tyler Townsend
Insects described in 1919